A list of towns in Europe with German town law. The year of law granting is listed when known.

Schleswig law 
)
Schleswig

Lübeck law
(Lübisches Recht)
Klaipėda (Memel), 1258
Braniewo (Braunsberg), 1254
Elbląg (Elbing), 1237
Gdańsk (Danzig), 1240
Hamburg, ca. 1190
Kołobrzeg (Kolberg), 1255
Koszalin (Köslin), 1266
Lübeck, 1143
Rostock, 1218
Słupsk (Stolp), 1265
Stralsund, 1234

Riga law
(Rigaer Recht)
Riga and several other Livonian towns

Schwerin-Parchim law
(Schweriner und Parchimer Recht)
Parchim, 1225
Schwerin, 1160

Stendal law
(Stendaler Recht)
Stendal, ca. 1160

Brandenburg law
(Brandenburger Recht)
Berlin, 1225–32
Brandenburg, 1170
Frankfurt an der Oder, 1253
Słupsk (Stolp), 1310
Stargard Szczeciński (Stargard in Pommern), 1253
Szczecin (Stettin), 1243
Wałcz (Deutsch-Krone), 1303

Kulm law
(Kulmer Recht)
Klaipėda (Memel), 1475
Biały Bór (Baldenburg), 1382
Bytów (Bütow), 1346
Chełmno (Kulm), 1233
Ciechanów (Ciechanow), 1400
Działdowo (Soldau), 1344
Grudziądz (Graudenz), 1291
Iława (Deutsch-Eylau), 1305
Kaliningrad (Königsberg), 1286
Kwidzyń (Marienwerder), 1233
Olsztyn (Allenstein), 1348
Płock (Plozk), 1237
Rawa
Różan (Rozan), 1378
Toruń (Thorn), 1233
Warsaw (Warschau), 1334

Magdeburg law
(Magdeburger Recht)
Bautzen, not later than 1213 (maybe 1157)
Brest, Belarus, 1390
Chemnitz, 1414
Cottbus
Dresden, 1299
Halle an der Saale, ca. 1150
Kapyl, 1652
Leipzig, 1161-1170
Magdeburg, 1188
Prudnik (Neustadt in Oberschlesien), 1279

Görlitz law
(Görlitzer Recht)
Görlitz/Zgorzelec, 1303

Lwówek Śląski law
(Löwenberger Recht)
Cieszyn/Český Těšín (Teschen), 1374
Lwówek Śląski (Löwenberg), before 1217
Oświęcim (Auschwitz)
Žilina (Sillein), 1357

Cheb law
(Egerer Recht)
Cheb (Eger), 1266

Old Prague law
(Prag-Altstädter Recht)
České Budějovice (Budweis), 1251
Plzeň (Pilsen), 1298
Prague (Prag), ca. 1230
Příbram (Freiberg in Böhmen)

Litoměřice law
(Leitmeritzer Recht)
Kolín (Kolin), 1261
Litoměřice (Leitmeritz), 1230

Jihlava law
(Iglauer Recht)
Havlíčkův Brod (Deutsch-Brod)
Jihlava (Iglau), 1249
Kremnica (Kremnitz), 1328
Kutná Hora (Kuttenberg)
Prague, Malá Strana, 1267
Sebeş (Mühlbach)
Sibiu (Hermannstadt), 1224

Brno law
(Brünner Recht)
Brno (Brünn), 1243
Znojmo (Znaim), 1226

Olomouc law
(Olmützer Recht)
Olomouc (Olmütz), 1261
Ostrava (Ostrau)
Uničov (Mährisch-Neustadt), 1223

Nysa law
(Neisser Recht)
Nysa (Neiße)

Głubczyce law
(Leobschützer Recht)
Głubczyce (Leobschütz), 1200

Środa Śląska law
Sroda Slaska law (Latin: ius Novi Fori, ius sredense, German: Neumarkt-Magdeburger Recht) was a legal constitution for a municipal form of government used in some Polish cities during the Middle Ages. It was based on town charter of Halle (Saale), a town located in German state of Saxony-Anhalt. Sroda Slaska law was popular in the 13th century in Lower Silesia, eastern Greater Poland and northern Lesser Poland. Altogether, some 100 towns were granted Sroda Slaska law, together with hundreds of villages. Introduction of this law was supported by Silesian Duke Henry I the Bearded, who frequently sent his envoys to Halle for consultation. Compared with Magdeburg rights, Sroda law as less advanced and more conservative, providing limited autonomy to towns. First town in the Kingdom of Poland which was granted Sroda Slaska law was Kostomloty (probably 1241), followed by Ujow and Sobotka.

Kalisz law (Latin: ius Calisiense) was a local variety of Sroda Slaska law, used in eastern Greater Poland and Wieluń Land. In 1283, Duke Przemysl II created high court of German law, located in Kalisz.

Bardejov (Bartfeld), 1370
Belz, 1377
Bochnia (Salzberg), 1253
Brest, 1390
Brzeg (Brieg), 1248
Chełm (Cholm), 1392
Dubno, 1507
Głogów (Glogau), 1253
Gniezno (Gnesen), 1243
Halych (Halicz)
Hrodna (Grodno), 1391
Hrubieszów (Hrubieszow), 1400
Humenné (Homenau)
Jarosław (Jaroslau), 1351
Jasło (Jaslo), 1366
Kalisz (Kalisch), 1282
Kamianets-Podilskyi (Kamenez Podolsk), 1374
Kaunas (Kauen), 1408
Khmilnyk (Chmelnik), 1448
Kielce, 1346
Kiev (Kiew), 1494
Kluczbork (Kreuzburg in Oberschlesien)
Kolomyia (Kolomea), 1405
Koprzywnica (Kopreinitz), 1268
Kraków (Krakau), 1257
Krupina (Karpfen), before 1241
Łódź, 1423
Lublin, 1317
Lutsk (Luzk), 1432
Lviv (Lemberg), 1356
Minsk, 1496
Navahrudak
Nowy Sącz (Neu Sandez)
Nowy Targ (Neumarkt), 1346
Oleśnica (Oels), 1255
Opava (Troppau), 1273
Polatsk (Polozk)
Poznań (Posen), 1253
Przemyśl (Przemysl), 1353
Radom, 1360
Radomsko
Rzeszów (Rzeszow), 1354
Sambir (Sambor)
Sandomierz (Sandomir), 1227
Siedlce, 1549
Sieradz (Schieratz)
Słupca (Slupca), 1296
Slutsk (Sluzk), 1441
Środa Śląska (Neumarkt in Schlesien), 1211
Tarnów, 1328
Terebovlia (Trembowla), 1389
Trakai (Troki)
Ujazd (Ujest), 1223
Vilnius (Wilna), 1387
Vitsebsk (Witebsk), 1547
Volodymyr-Volynskyi (Wladimir Wolynsk), before 1324
Wrocław (Breslau), 1242
Zgierz, 1224
Zhytomyr (Schitomir), 1444
Żmigród (Trachenberg), 1253

South German law
(Süddeutsches Stadtrecht)
Alba Iulia (Karlsburg)
Amberg
Bad Reichenhall
Banská Bystrica (Neusohl), 1255
Berehovo, 1342
Bistriţa (Bistritz)
Braşov (Kronstadt)
Bratislava (Pressburg), 1291
Bruck an der Mur
Buda (Ofen), ca. 1350
Celje (Cilli)
Campulung (Langenau), ca. 1300
Cluj-Napoca (Klausenburg)
Dej (Desch)
Eger (Erlau)
Esztergom (Gran)
Gorizia (Görz), 1307
Graz, 1281
Győr (Raab), 1271
Kežmarok (Käsmark), 1269
Khust (Hust)
Kočevje (Gottschee)
Komárom/Komárno (Komorn), 1265
Košice (Kaschau), 1347
Levoča (Leutschau), 1271
Linz, 1241
Maribor (Marburg an der Drau), 1254
Munich (München), 1294
Nitra (Neutra), 1248
Nuremberg, 1200
Oradea (Großwardein)
Passau, 1255
Pécs (Fünfkirchen)
Pest, 1244
Piatra Neamț
Prešov (Preschau), 1374
Regensburg, 1207/1230
Rimavská Sobota (Großsteffelsdorf)
Salzburg, 1368
Sankt Pölten, 1159
Sárospatak
Satu Mare (Sathmar), 1213
Sighetu Marmaţiei (Marmarosch Sziget)
Sighişoara (Schäßburg)
Sopron (Ödenburg)
Steyr, 1287
Suceava (Sutschawa)
Szeged (Szegedin)
Székesfehérvár (Stuhlweißenburg), 1237
Szentgotthárd (Sankt Gotthard)
Szombathely (Steinamanger)
Târgu Jiu
Trnava (Tyrnau) 1238
Varaždin (Warasdin)
Vasvár (Eisenburg)
Vienna (Wien), 1221/1237/1296
Villach, 1239
Vukovar
Wiener Neustadt, 1277
Zagreb (Agram), 1242

References
Krallert, Wilfried. Atlas zur Geschichte der deutschen Ostsiedlung. Velhagen & Klasing. Bielefeld. 1958.
Magocsi, Paul Robert. Historical Atlas of Central Europe: Revised and Expanded Edition. University of Washington Press. Seattle. 2002. 

Town law
Law of Germany